Eje Central is a station on Line 12 of the Mexico City Metro. The station is located between Parque de los Venados and Ermita. It was opened on 30 October 2012 as a part of the first stretch of Line 12 between Mixcoac and Tláhuac.

Name and pictogram
The station receives its name due to being located at the intersection between Eje Central (Lázaro Cardenas) and Avenida Popocatépetl. The station's pictogram shows the outline of a Mexico City trolleybus, since Line 1 of Mexico City trolleybus service (also known as the Zero Emissions Corridor) runs all the way on the Eje Central.

General information
The station is located south of the city center in the Portales Sur neighborhood in the Benito Juárez borough and it is built underground.

From 23 April to 22 June 2020, the station was temporarily closed due to the COVID-19 pandemic in Mexico.

Ridership

References

External links 
 

Eje Central
Railway stations opened in 2012
2012 establishments in Mexico
Mexico City Metro stations in Benito Juárez, Mexico City
Accessible Mexico City Metro stations